Sphagnum angustifolium, the fine bogmoss, is a species of peat moss with a Holarctic distribution.

References

External links
USDA PLANTS profile
Sphagnum angustifolium @ Moss Flora of China

angustifolium